Norman Brookes and Anthony Wilding were the defending champions, but Wilding was killed during World War I. Brookes partnered with Gerald Patterson but they lost in the semifinals to eventual champions Pat O'Hara Wood and Ronald Thomas.

O'Hara Wood and Thomas defeated Rodney Heath and Randolph Lycett in the final, 6–4, 6–2, 4–6, 6–2 to win the gentlemen's doubles tennis title at the 1919 Wimbledon Championships.

Draw

Finals

Top half

Section 1

Section 2

The nationality of G Fisher and CGM Plumer are unknown.

Bottom half

Section 3

The nationality of JM Gatherall is unknown.

Section 4

References

External links

Men's Doubles
Wimbledon Championship by year – Men's doubles